Dublin South County may refer to:

 South Dublin county, created in 1994
 Dublin County South (Dáil constituency) (1969–1981)